Tonle Cham Camp (also known as Tonle Cham Special Forces Camp or Tong Le Chon Special Force camp) is a former U.S. Army and Army of the Republic of Vietnam (ARVN) base southwest of An Lộc in southern Vietnam.

History
The 5th Special Forces Group Detachment A-334 first established a base here in 1967 to monitor communist infiltration from base areas in the Fishhook (Cambodia).The base was located beside the Saigon River on Route 248 8 km southeast of the Fishhook and approximately 14 km southwest of An Lộc.

On 28 November 1968 Lockheed C-130B Hercules #61-2644 of the 776th Tactical Airlift Squadron was damaged beyond repair after its nose gear failed while landing at Tonle Cham

Following the Battle of An Lộc the base was transferred to the 92nd Ranger Battalion in late 1972.

On 25 March 1973, less than 2 months after the Paris Peace Accords went into effect, the People's Army of Vietnam (PAVN) began a siege of the camp. The Rangers held out for more than a year before they abandoned the base to the PAVN on 12 April 1974.

Current use
The base has been turned over to farmland and housing.

References

Installations of the United States Army in South Vietnam
Installations of the Army of the Republic of Vietnam
Buildings and structures in Bình Phước province